Halloween: Resurrection is a 2002 American  slasher film directed by Rick Rosenthal, who had also directed Halloween II in 1981. Larry Brand and Sean Hood devised the screenplay. The film is a direct sequel to Halloween H20: Twenty Years Later and the eighth installment overall in the Halloween franchise. It stars Busta Rhymes, Bianca Kajlich, Thomas Ian Nicholas, Ryan Merriman, Sean Patrick Thomas, Tyra Banks and Jamie Lee Curtis, with Brad Loree as the primary villain Michael Myers. This was the final installment of the H20 timeline of the Halloween franchise, which had just been rebooted with the previous movie in 1998, before it was rebooted again in 2007 and again in 2018. The film follows Myers continuing his murderous rampage in his hometown of Haddonfield when his childhood house is used for a live internet horror show.

Halloween: Resurrection was released on July 12, 2002, to largely unfavorable reviews, with many considering it an unnecessary sequel to Halloween H20. Many critics have deemed it to be one of the worst films in the Halloween franchise. The film also underperformed at the box office, only grossing $37.6 million worldwide against a $15 million budget. Although another sequel was planned to follow Resurrection, the next film in the franchise became Halloween, a 2007 remake directed by Rob Zombie.

Plot
Three years after the murders at Hillcrest Academy, a guilt-ridden Laurie Strode is institutionalized in Grace Andersen Sanitarium. It is revealed that the person she previously decapitated, whom she believed to be Michael Myers, was in fact a paramedic that Michael had switched clothes with and rendered mute. Anticipating her brother's inevitable return, Laurie sets a trap on the sanitarium's roof. 

Michael appears and chases Laurie to the rooftop, where her trap works and temporarily incapacitates Michael. However, Laurie's fears of killing the wrong person again get the better of her. When she attempts to remove his mask to confirm his identity, Michael stabs and throws her off the rooftop to her death.

On Halloween, college students Sara Moyer, Bill Woodlake, Donna Chang, Jen Danzig, Jim Morgan and Rudy Grimes win a competition to appear on an Internet reality show called Dangertainment, directed by Freddie Harris and Nora Winston. The students have to spend a night in Michael's abandoned childhood house in order to figure out what led him to kill. However, while setting up cameras throughout the house in preparation for the show, cameraman Charlie is killed by Michael, who has returned to Haddonfield. On Halloween night, equipped with head cameras, Sara, Bill, Donna, Jen, Jim, and Rudy enter the house and separate into three groups to search for clues. While Sara messages friends, Myles "Deckard" Barton watches the live broadcast during a party. During the search, Michael suddenly appears and kills Bill.

Donna and Jim discover a wall filled with fake corpses and realize that the show is a setup, before the former is killed by Michael. At the party, Deckard and other partygoers witness the murder. But only Deckard realizes that it was real. Meanwhile, Freddie enters the house dressed as Michael in order to scare the competitors. He is followed by the real Michael, whom he mistakes for Charlie. When Rudy, Sara, and Jim find Freddie in the Michael costume, he reveals the scheme to them and begs them to cooperate, telling them that they will all be paid well if the show works out. After Freddie leaves, the trio decides to gather up the rest of their friends and leave. Jen discovers Bill's corpse, and Michael decapitates her in front of Rudy, Sara, and Jim, who soon realize that it isn't Freddie. Michael proceeds to kill Jim and Rudy before chasing Sara upstairs.

Locking herself in a bedroom, Sara begs Deckard to help her. As the other partygoers realize that all the murders are real, Deckard begins to message Sara Michael's locations to help her avoid him. Sara runs into Freddie just as Michael finds them and stabs the latter. Sara runs into the tunnels and finds an exit leading to the garage, where she discovers Nora's body. Michael again arrives and attacks Sara, but a still-living Freddie finds them and fights Michael as an electrical fire starts in the garage. After electrocuting Michael, Freddie carries Sara to safety, leaving Michael to die in the burning garage. Later, Freddie and Sara are interviewed by the local news, during which Sara thanks Deckard for saving her life and Freddie assaults the reporter. Meanwhile, Michael is presumed dead and his body is taken to the morgue. However, as the coroner prepares to examine his body, Michael suddenly awakens.

Cast

 Jamie Lee Curtis as Laurie Strode
 Brad Loree as Michael Myers 
 Busta Rhymes as Freddie Harris
 Bianca Kajlich as Sara Moyer
 Sean Patrick Thomas as Rudy Grimes
 Daisy McCrackin as Donna Chang
 Katee Sackhoff as Jennifer 'Jen' Danzig
 Luke Kirby as Jim Morgan
 Thomas Ian Nicholas as Bill Woodlake
 Ryan Merriman as Myles 'Deckard' Barton
 Tyra Banks as Nora Winston
 Gus Lynch as Harold Trumble
 Lorena Gale as Nurse Wells 
 Marisa Rudiak as Nurse Phillips 
 Brent Chapman as Franklin Munroe 
 Dan Joffre as Willie Haines
 Haig Sutherland as Aron
 Brad Sihvon as Charlie Albans  
 Rick Rosenthal as Professor Mixter

Production
The writers of Halloween H20: 20 Years Later were left with a dilemma when Jamie Lee Curtis wanted to end the series, but Moustapha Akkad had a clause that legally wouldn't allow the writers to kill Michael Myers off. According to the Blu-ray released by Scream Factory, Curtis almost left the project just weeks before filming, until Kevin Williamson came up with the paramedic story line and presented it to Akkad. Curtis finally agreed to be a part of the film under the condition that no footage hinting toward a sequel would be presented by the film, and that the audience would believe that Michael was dead until the inevitable sequel was announced. Resurrections first shot of Michael in the paramedic uniform was filmed the day after H20s principal photography ended, according to H20s editor, Patrick Lussier. Daniel Farrands, screenwriter of Halloween: The Curse of Michael Myers, unsuccessfully proposed  Halloween 8: Lord of the Dead, which would have featured Laurie Strode as the main antagonist.

Both Whitney Ransick and Dwight H. Little were approached to direct the film but turned it down. Later Rick Rosenthal, the director of Halloween II, was chosen to direct. During the casting period of the film, producers considered Danielle Harris (who played Jamie Lloyd in Halloween 4: The Return of Michael Myers and Halloween 5: The Revenge of Michael Myers) for a role in the film. Bianca Kajlich's screams had to be dubbed in postproduction because of her inability to scream. The film's trailer was delivered on April 26, 2002, with the release of Jason X. Principal photography began in Vancouver, British Columbia on May 14, 2001 with the opening scene filmed at Riverview Hospital in Coquitlam, BC.

Originally known as Halloween: Homecoming, Halloween H2K, and Halloween: MichaelMyers.com before the producers chose the final title as they wanted one that let audiences know Michael Myers was alive.

Music
The score for Halloween: Resurrection was composed by Danny Lux. The score incorporates electro-acoustic instrumentation with roots in synthesizer-heavy scores of the early 1980s. The film also features several rap and hip-hop songs.

In direct contrast to general critical reviews of the film, some assessments of its sound and theme music have been praising. For example, critic Steve Newton complimented the film's "creepy" and "unsettling" revival of the original iconic theme, while criticizing the film itself, as well as the rap tracks included.

Home media
Halloween: Resurrection was released on VHS and DVD on December 10, 2002, which includes a web cam special using as found footage featuring the film's characters are set inside of Michael Myers' haunted house with alternate and deleted scenes.

Reception

Box office
Halloween: Resurrection was released on July 12, 2002 in the US to moderate reception which did not change in its later international release. The film peaked at #4 on its opening weekend on US screens raking in $12,292,121 behind Reign of Fire, Road to Perdition and Men in Black II. It grossed $30,354,442 domestically and a further $7,310,413 for a $37,664,855 worldwide gross.

Critical response
On Rotten Tomatoes the film has an approval rating of 10% based on 68 reviews, with the site's consensus being: "The only thing this tired slasher flick may resurrect is nostalgia for when the genre was still fresh and scary." On Metacritic, the film has a score of 19 out of 100, based on 17 reviews, indicating "overwhelming dislike". Audiences polled by CinemaScore gave the film an average grade of "B+" on an A+ to F scale.

Lou Lumenick of the New York Post said, "It's so devoid of joy and energy it makes even Jason X look positively Shakespearian by comparison." Dave Kehr of the New York Times said, "Spectators will indeed sit open-mouthed before the screen, not screaming but yawning." Peter Travers of Rolling Stone said, "Every sequel you skip will be two hours gained. Consider this review life-affirming." Joe Leydon of Variety said, "[Seems] even more uselessly redundant and shamelessly money-grubbing than most third-rate horror sequels."

In 2018, while promoting the reboot, John Carpenter revealed that he had seen Halloween: Resurrection stating, "I watched the one in that house, with all the cameras. Oh my god. Oh lord, god. And then the guy gives the speech at the end about violence. What the hell? Oh my lord. I couldn't believe."

See also
 List of films featuring surveillance

References

External links
 
 
 

8
2002 horror films
American slasher films
2000s slasher films
2000s English-language films
Films set in 1998
Films set in 2001
Films set in 2002
Films set in abandoned houses
Reality television series parodies
Films set in Illinois
Films set in universities and colleges
Films set in psychiatric hospitals
2000s comedy horror films
American sequel films
Dimension Films films
Miramax films
2002 films
American serial killer films
Sororicide in fiction
Films directed by Rick Rosenthal
Films shot in Vancouver
Films about post-traumatic stress disorder
Films with screenplays by Sean Hood
2000s American films